Tardun is a small town in the Mid West region of Western Australia.

The townsite is located along the Mullewa to Wongan Hills railway line. The location of the town was decided in 1913 when the route of the railway was being planned.
The name of the town was originally Undatarra when it was gazetted in 1913, it was then changed to Tardun in 1925 and lots were surveyed in 1927.

Education
The Christian Brothers Agricultural School was founded in Tardun in 1928 for child migrants from Britain. It closed in 2009.
In testimony before a British parliamentary committee investigating British child migrants sent to Australia in the late 1990s, one boy spoke of the criminal abuse he received from Catholic priests at Tardun.  He testified that several of them competed to see who would be the first to rape him 100 times.  They liked his blue eyes, so he repeatedly beat himself in the hope they would change colour. As parliamentarians reflected at the time, the term "sexual abuse" seemed wholly inadequate given the awfulness of his experience.

In December 2014, the Royal Commission into Institutional Responses to Child Sexual Abuse found that "Christian Brothers leaders knew of allegations of sexual abuse of children at four WA orphanages, including Tardun, and failed to manage the homes to prevent the systemic ill-treatment for decades." It also found that the institution was concerned by the cost of legal proceedings, and "there was no sentiment of recognising the suffering of the survivors."

Further reading
 Our Home in the Bush: Tales of Tardun by David H. Plowman, published by Tardun Old Boys' Association (1994), ASIN B001AC4T0E

References 

Mid West (Western Australia)